In the geologic timescale, the Kimmeridgian is an age in the Late Jurassic Epoch and a stage in the Upper Jurassic Series. It spans the time between 157.3 ± 1.0 Ma and 152.1 ± 0.9 Ma (million years ago). The Kimmeridgian follows the Oxfordian and precedes the Tithonian.

Stratigraphic definition
The Kimmeridgian Stage takes its name from the village of Kimmeridge on the Dorset coast, England. The name was introduced into the literature by French geologist Alcide d'Orbigny in 1842. The Kimmeridge Clay Formation takes its name from the same type location (although this formation extends from the Kimmeridgian stage of the Upper Jurassic into the Lower Cretaceous). It is the source for about 95% of the petroleum in the North Sea.

Historically, the term Kimmeridgian has been used in two different ways. The base of the interval is the same but the top was defined by British stratigraphers as the base of the Portlandian (sensu anglico) whereas in France the top was defined as the base of the Tithonian (sensu gallico). The differences have not yet been fully resolved;  Tithonian is the uppermost stage of the Jurassic in the timescale of the ICS.

The base of the Kimmeridgian is at the first appearance of ammonite species Pictonia baylei in the stratigraphic column. The Global Boundary Stratotype Section and Point (GSSP) for the base of the Kimmeridgian is the Flodigarry section at Staffin Bay on the Isle of Skye, Scotland, which was ratified in 2021. The boundary is defined by the first appearance of ammonites marking the boreal Bauhini Zone and the subboreal Baylei Zone. The top of the Kimmeridgian (the base of the Tithonian) is at the first appearance of ammonite species Hybonoticeras hybonotum. It also coincides with the top of magnetic anomaly M22An.

Subdivision
The Kimmeridgian is sometimes subdivided into Upper and Lower substages. In the Tethys domain, the Kimmeridgian contains seven ammonite biozones:
zone of Hybonoticeras beckeri
zone of Aulacostephanus eudoxus
zone of Aspidoceras acanthicum
zone of Crussoliceras divisum
zone of Ataxioceras hypselocyclum
zone of Sutneria platynota
zone of Idoceras planula

References

Notes

Literature
; 2004: A Geologic Time Scale 2004, Cambridge University Press.
; 1832: Sur Les Soulèvemens Jurassiques Du Porrentruy: Description Géognostique de la Série Jurassique et Théorie Orographique du Soulèvement, Mémoires de la Société d'histoire naturelle de Strasbourg 1: pp 1–84, F. G. Levrault, Paris.

External links
GeoWhen Database - Kimmeridgian
Jurassic-Cretaceous timescale, at the website of the subcommission for stratigraphic information of the ICS
Stratigraphic chart of the Upper Jurassic, at the website of Norges Network of offshore records of geology and stratigraphy

 
02
Geological ages